Guanine nucleotide-binding protein subunit beta-like protein 1 is a protein that in humans is encoded by the GNB1L gene.

This gene encodes a G-protein beta-subunit-like polypeptide which is a member of the WD repeat protein family. WD repeats are minimally conserved regions of approximately 40 amino acids typically bracketed by gly-his and trp-asp (GH-WD), which may facilitate formation of heterotrimeric or multiprotein complexes. Members of this family are involved in a variety of cellular processes, including cell cycle progression, signal transduction, apoptosis, and gene regulation. This protein contains 6 WD repeats and is highly expressed in the heart. The gene maps to the region on chromosome 22q11, which is deleted in DiGeorge syndrome, trisomic in derivative 22 syndrome and tetrasomic in cat-eye syndrome. Therefore, this gene may contribute to the etiology of those disorders. Transcripts from this gene share exons with some transcripts from the C22orf29 gene.

References

Further reading